Gregory Raybon is an engineer at Bell Labs in New Providence, New Jersey. He was named a Fellow of the Institute of Electrical and Electronics Engineers (IEEE) in 2016 for his contributions to high-speed optical communication systems.

References

Fellow Members of the IEEE
Living people
21st-century American engineers
Year of birth missing (living people)
Place of birth missing (living people)
American electrical engineers